Nefyodovka is a rural locality (a village) in Yesiplevskoye Rural Settlement, Kolchuginsky District, Vladimir Oblast, Russia. The population was 5 as of 2010.

Geography 
Nefyodovka is located 24 km east of Kolchugino (the district's administrative centre) by road. Novosekovo is the nearest rural locality.

References 

Rural localities in Kolchuginsky District